Christa Lang-Fuller (born 23 December 1943) is a German-American film and television actress and screenwriter. Lang worked frequently with her husband, director Samuel Fuller and is known for such films as White Dog, Dead Pigeon on Beethoven Street, What's Up, Doc?, Land of Plenty, No Fear, No Die, Alphaville, The Big Red One, Nickelodeon and Thieves After Dark.

Early life
Christa Lang was born in Winterberg, Germany. At age seventeen, Lang moved to France, working in Paris as an au pair and a translator for a textile firm while studying acting.

Career
Lang made her film debut in the French new wave film The Murderer Knows the Score (1963), and had an uncredited walk-on role in Alphaville (1965). In 1967, she had a supporting part in The Champagne Murders opposite Anthony Perkins, followed by a supporting role in What's Up, Doc? (1972) opposite Barbra Streisand. In 1976, she appeared as Anna Hauptmann in The Lindbergh Kidnapping Case, based on the Lindbergh kidnapping.

She would go on to appear in her husband, Samuel Fuller's film White Dog (1982). In 1981, Lang co-founded Chrisam Films with Fuller. She also appeared in the French film Thieves After Dark (1984), and The Blood of Others (1984), opposite Jodie Foster and Sam Neill.

As a screenwriter, Lang is perhaps best known as the co-writer, with her husband, of the 1994 film Girls in Prison.

Personal life
Lang was married to director Samuel Fuller from 1967 until his death in 1997. They had one daughter, Samantha Fuller.

Filmography as actress

References

External links

Christa Lang at Encyclopædia Britannica

1943 births
20th-century German actresses
21st-century German actresses
American film actresses
German film actresses
German women screenwriters
German screenwriters
Living people
People from Winterberg
21st-century American women